The Art and Olfaction Awards are a non-profit award mechanism designed to celebrate excellence in international artisan, experimental and independent perfumery and olfactory art through a yearly blind-judged competition.

Mission 

The organization states the following as its mission:

"Awarded to just four perfumes and one experimental project a year, The Art and Olfaction Award is designed to raise interest and awareness for independent and artisan perfumers - and experimental practitioners with scent - from all countries. By shining a spotlight on perfumery’s most outstanding creators, we hope to help generate support for independent practices in perfumery as a whole. The Art and Olfaction Awards are a program of The Institute for Art and Olfaction, a 501(c)3 non-profit organization based in Los Angeles, USA."

History 

The Art and Olfaction Awards were founded in 2013 as a program of The Institute for Art and Olfaction in Los Angeles. The first awards ceremony took place in April, 2014, at Goethe Institut Los Angeles. At this first event, awards were given in two categories: Independent and Artisan.

In 2015, the awards expanded upon their existing categories by adding The Sadakichi Award for Experimental Work with Scent - named after the critic and writer Sadakichi Hartmann in honor of his failed scent concert from the early 20th century. The Sadakichi Award was added as "a new category aimed at recognizing innovative uses of scent beyond the bounds of commercial perfumery" - joining the artisan and independent awards to create what was intended as a broad snapshot of the diversity and creative potential in the field of perfume.

The third annual Art and Olfaction Awards were held on May 6, 2016 at Hammer Museum as part of their public programming. The expanded event was hosted by artist and producer Zackary Drucker, and was free, open to the public, and live streamed on the internet. In an effort to better cement the award's international commitment, the fourth annual Art and Olfaction Awards take place in May 2017 at Silent Green kulturquartier in Berlin. The finalists are announced yearly at Esxence in Milan.

The Art and Olfaction Awards were created as mechanism to impartially judge and promote work being done by artisan perfumers, independent perfume houses, and creative practitioners working with scent in the context of arts or experimental practices. Limited to artists, artisan perfumers and independent perfume houses (which they define as brands that are independently owned, or owned by another independently owned company), they are closed to larger-scale perfume releases - a space already served by The Fragrance Foundation's Awards. In that capacity they have been compared to the film industry's Independent Spirit Awards. Indeed, the awards were created based on founder Saskia Wilson-Brown's experience with film festivals:

"The awards represented a chance to apply what I learned in the film festival world to the perfume world. In fact, we adapted many of the structures that go into running a film festival for the Art and Olfaction Awards, namely: Low entry fees, [...] unbiased judging (in many film festivals you are excluded from judging a film that you have a personal tie to), a diversity of judges, and a non-profit art for arts-sake motivation.”

Several further systems were put into place to ensure fairness, including blind, multiple-phase judging. The result was what Luca Turin called '[...]the only fluff-free fragrance contest in the world'.

There are two artisan category winners out of ten finalists, two independent category winners out of ten finalists, and one Sadakichi Award for Experimental Work with Scent winner out of five finalists per year. Winners each receive a golden pear statuette.

Past winners 

Artisan Category Winners

"Calling All Angels", by April Aromatics, Germany  - 2014 winner

"John Frum", by Aether Arts Perfumes, US - 2014 winner

"Eau de Céleri", by Monsillage, Canada - 2015 winner

"Woodcut", by Olympic Orchids, US - 2015 winner

"Incendo", by La Curie, US - 2016 winner

"Miyako", by Auphorie, Malaysia - 2016 winner

"Mélodie de l’Amour", by Parfums Dusita, France - 2017 winner

"Bruise Violet", by Sixteen92, US - 2017 winner

"Chienoir", by BedeauX, England - 2018 winner

"Club Design", by The Zoo, US/Germany - 2018 winner

"Hyde", by Hiram Green Perfumes, Netherlands - 2019 winner

"Powder & Dust", by SP Perfumes, Germany - 2019 winner

"Bonsai by House of Matriarch - 2020 winner

"Nimbis" by Parallax Olfactory - 2020 winner

Independent Category Winners

"Ashoka", by Neela Vermeire Creations, France (with Bertrand Duchaufour) - 2014 winner

"König", by Yosh, US (with Olivia Jan, Robertet) - 2014 winner

"Black Pepper & Sandalwood", by Acca Kappa, Italy (with Luca Maffei) - 2015 winner

"Skive", by Canoe, USA (with Jessica Hannah) - 2015 winner

"Bat", by Zoologist Perfumes, Canada (with Ellen Covey) - 2016 winner

"Néa", by Jul et Mad Paris, France (with Luca Maffei) - 2016 winner

"Altruist", by J.F. Schwarzlose Berlin, Germany (with Véronique Nyberg) - 2017 winner

"Fathom V", by BeauFort London, England (with Julie Marlowe) - 2017 winner

"Eau de Virginie", by Au Pays de la Fleur d'Oranger (with Jean-Claude Gigodot) - 2018 winner

"Nuit de Bakelite", by Naomi Goodsir (with Isabelle Doyen) - 2018 winner

"Colorado", by American Perfumer, USA (with Dawn Spencer Hurwitz) - 2019 winner

"Rich Mess", by Ryan Richmond, USA (with Christophe Laudamiel) - 2019 winner

"Young Hearts", by Bruno Acampora Profumi (with Miguel Matos) - 2020 winner

"PostHume", by Son Venïn (with Rosine Courage) - 2020 winner

Sadakichi Award for Experimental Work with Scent Winners

"Famous Deaths", by Sense of Smell Project, The Netherlands - 2015 winner

"Century's Breath", by Cat Jones, Australia - 2016 winner

"Osmodrama / Smeller 2.0" by Wolfgang Georgsdorf, Germany (with Geza Schön) - 2017 winner

"Under the Horizon", by Oswaldo Macia (with Ricardo Moya), Columbia / UK - 2018 winner

"Diary of Smells: Glass Ceiling", by Josely Carvalho (with Leandro Petit), Brazil - 2019 winner

"Jónsi: Í blóma (In bloom), Hvítblinda (Whiteout), Svartalda (Dark wave)" by Jónsi Birgisson - 2020 winner

Contribution to Scent Culture Award

Christophe Laudamiel - 2017 winner

Peter de Cupere - 2018 winner

Sissel Tolaas - 2019 winner

No award was given in 2020

Aftel Award for Handmade Perfume

"Pays Dogon", by Monsillage, Canada - 2018 winner

"Maderas de Oriente Oscuro", by PK Perfumes, USA - 2019 winner

"Rasa", by Pomare’s Stolen Perfume - 2020 winner

Other Awards

Algorithmic Perfumery (project lead: Frederik Duerinck), Septimus Piesse Visionary Award - 2019

Past Finalists 

2014 Finalists

Artisan Category: "Blackbird", Olympic Orchids; "Golden Hour", Artemisia Perfumes; "Lampblack", Bruno Fazzolari; "Magnolia Esxentialis", Cristiano Canali; "Mosaic", Imaginary Authors; "Owl", Sweet Anthem Perfumes; "Semsei", Piotr Czarnecki; "Vesper", Mik Moi

Independent Category: "Blood Sweat Tears", Atelier De Geste; "Christopher Street", Charenton Macerations; "Feu Follet", by Friede Modin; "FR!01/02", by Fragrance Republ!c; "Jardin Mystique", by Friede Modin; "Only for Her", Hayari Parfums; "Sahraa Oud", Fragrance DuBois, France

2015 Finalists

Artisan Category: "A City on Fire", Imaginary Authors; "Foxglove", DS & Durga; "Tobacco Cognac", House of Cherry Bomb

Independent Category: "Boccanera", OrtoParisi; "Ombre Indigo", Olfactive Studio, France; "Pashay", Ray Matts

Sadakichi Award for Experimental Work with Scent: "Catalin", by Charles Long, Carrie Paterson, Karen Reitzel, Seth Hawkins, Emery Martin, Michael Mascha; "Chroma", by Dawn Spencer Hurwitz; "Crime and Punishment", by Mike McGinley, Charles McGinley; "In Libro de Tenebris", by Paul Schütze

2016 Finalists

Artisan Category: "Albino", DSH Perfumes; "Bird of Paradise", Thorn & Bloom Perfume; "Cape Cod Wild Beach Rose", Nomaterra; "Love for 3 Oranges", Aether Arts Perfumes; "Musk Rose Attar", Rising Phoenix; "Namibia", Frazer Parfum; "Peach Tree Garden", Phoenix Botanicals; "Salomé", Papillon Artisan Perfumes

Independent Category: "Panorama", Olfactive Studio; "Waihèke Dreams", Juliana Parfums Co.; "Fougère Nobile", Nobile 1942; "Salim Attar", Tabacora Parfums; "Past | Presence", Roads; "Dark Ride", Xyrena;"Elephant + Roses", Maria Candida Gentile Maitre Parfumeur; "Rose de Taif Extrait", Perris Monte Carlo

Sadakichi Award for Experimental Work with Scent: "Dear Enemy", by Christy Gast, with Camila Marambio, Derek Corcoran, Giorgia Graells; "The Juice of War", by Maki Ueda; "Signal", by Carrie Paterson; "Western Drive", by Kellen Walker

2017 Finalists

Artisan Category: "Baraonda", Nasomatto; "Ceremony", Mirus Fine Fragrance; "Fatih Sultan Mehmed", Fort and Manlé; "Limestone", Thorn & Bloom; "Liquorice Vetiver", SP Parfums; "Onycha", Dawn Spencer Hurwitz; "Rosuerrier", Pryn Parfum; "Saffron", Aether Arts Perfume; "Vanilla and the Sea", Phoenix Botanicals

Independent Category: "Absolue D'Osmanthe", Perris Monte Carlo; "Anti Anti", Atelier PMP; "Belle de Jour", Eris Parfums; "Civet", Zoologist; "Close Up", Olfactive Studio; "Lankaran Forest", Maria Candida Gentile Maitre Parfumeur; "Maître Chausseur", Extrait D'Atelier; "Romanza", Masque Milano; "Stones", Atelier de Geste

Sadakichi Award for Experimental Work with Scent: "Is This Mankind", Peter de Cupere; "Paradise Paradoxe", Elodie Pong; "Smell of Data", Leanne Wijnsma; "The Feelies: Multisensory Storytelling - Amazon", Grace Boyle

2018 Finalists

Artisan Category: "Bee's Bliss", Sonoma Scent Studio; "Cigar Rum", Strangers Perfumerie; "Impressions de Giverny", Fort and Manlé; "Morah", Pryn Parfum; "Silphium", Stora Skuggan; "Touchstone", Aesther Arts Perfume; "Villa M", Paul Schütze Perfume; "Wonderly", House of Oud

Independent Category: "A.E.O.M.", Bijon; "Ankh Sun Amon", Anima Mundi Perfume; "Cacao Aztèque", Perris Monte Carlo; "Elephant", Zoologist; "London", Gallivant Perfumes; "Osang", Talismans - Collezione Preziosa; "Pink Heart v.6", Map of the Heart; "Rose Olivier", Bastide

Sadakichi Award for Experimental Work with Scent: "Olfactory Games", Maki Ueda; "Smoke Flowers", Peter de Cupere; "Whoa (Pineapple Nails)", Aleesa Cohene; "The Library of Smell", Hisako Inoue

2019 Finalists

Artisan Category: "15", OSM; "Carré Blanc", The Zoo; "Gardener's Glove", St. Clair Scents; "Irisistible", April Aromatics; "L'Anima Della Rosa", Auphorie; "La Bibliothèque", NeZ ZeN; "Rosé All Daé", Gallagher Fragrances; "Violeta", Jade Daisy Perfumes

Independent Category: "Atlante", Sarah Baker Perfumes; "Birds In Paradise", Régime des Fleurs; "Dulceo", Cūrata; "Falls", Régime des Fleurs; "Migration de l'Arbre", Senyokô; "Rake & Ruin", BeauFort London; "Red Shoes", Jacques Fath Parfums; "Rubacuori", MIRUMest

Sadakichi Award for Experimental Work with Scent: "Tangible Scents: Composition of Rose in the Air", Maki Ueda; "Every Word Was Once an Animal", Carla Bengtson; "Smell Forward", Priscille Jotzu; "Veneno", Miguel Matos

2020 Finalists

Artisan Category: "Absinthe-Minded", Anka Kuş Parfüm; "Bonsai", House of Matriarch; "Eve", St. Clair Scents; "Fall", Criminal Elements; "Impermanence", Christèle Jacquemin; "Keman", DI SER; "Nepenthe", En Voyage Perfumes; "Nimbis", Parallax Olfactory; "OBO #302", OK Fine Fragrances; "Perfumista", Anatole Lebreton; "Rasa", Pomares Stolen Perfume; "Weinstrasse", Chatillon Lux; "Wild Child", CognoScenti

Independent Category: "20|20", J. F. Schwarzlose Berlin; "Accento Overdose", Xerjoff; "Amyi VIII", Amyi; "Bee", Zoologist; "Behique", Renier Perfumes; "Ganymede", Marc-Antoine Barrois; "Love Kills", MASQUE Milano; "Moire", Les Nez Parfums d'Auteurs; "November 2019", Scent Trunk; "Post_Hume", Son Venïn; "Squid", Zoologist; "Young Hearts", Bruno Acampora Profumi

Sadakichi Award for Experimental Work with Scent: "Cerca (Closer)", Alejandro Ros and Pablo Eduardo Schanton; "Jónsi (Hvítblinda / Í blóma /  Svartalda)", Jónsi Birgisson; "Notes", Lauren Jetty; "Olfactory Labyrinth V. 5: Invisible Footprints", Maki Ueda; "Tree VR", Milica Zec and Winslow Turner Porter III

Past Judges 
Past judges include Stefan Sagmeister, Christophe Laudamiel, Luca Turin, Mandy Aftel, Sarah Horowitz-Thran, Michael Edwards,  Annick Le Guérer, Katie Puckrik, Spyros Drosopoulos, Andy Tauer, Helder Suffenplan, Andreas Wilhelm, Denyse Beaulieu, Mark Behnke, Matthias Janke, Steven Gontarski, Antonio Gardoni, Ashley Eden Kessler, Bruno Fazzolari, Dana El Masri, Harald Lübner, Sherri Sebastian, Yvettra Grantham, Ashraf Osman, Caro Verbeek, Kaya Sorhaindo, Kóan Jeff Baysa, Matthias Tabert, Simon Niedenthal,  Allison Agsten, Bettina Hubby, Brent Leonesio, Daniel Krasofski, Deji Bryce Olukotun, Hank Jenkins, James McHugh, Laura Johnson, Lizzie Ostrom (AKA Odette Toilette), Marcos Lutyens, Mark Allen, Miriam Vareldzis, Christopher Gordon, Grant Osborne, Neal Harris, Sarah Baker, Peter de Cupere, Persephenie Lea, Sebastian Fischenich.

Select Articles + Links 
'Experimental Scent Summit and Art and Olfaction Awards by The Perfume Society, 2018

'Nouveaux Horizons de l'Art Olfactif' by Jeanne Doré, Nez Magazine, 12 May 2017

'Olfactory Art', by Susan Stone, Monocle Arts Review, 26 May 2017

'What did Qaddafi's Death Smell Like', by Nicola Twilley, The New Yorker, April 23, 2015

'Message in a Bottle', by Luca Turin, Style Arabia, April 20, 2015

'Institute for Art and Olfaction Elevates the Senses', by Ingrid Schmidt, LA Times, December 21, 2014

'Report from the second annual Art & Olfaction Awards', Basenotes, 27 April 2015

'An Overview of the 3rd Annual Institute for Art and Olfaction Awards', Basenotes, 11 May 2016

'Art and Olfaction Awards Celebrates Artisan Perfumers', by Mary Orlin, Huffington Post, 1 December 2014

References 

Awards established in 2013
Perfumery
Olfactory art